Sylvain Cros (born 2 June 1980 in Clermont-Ferrand) is a long-distance freestyle swimmer from France, who won the bronze medal in the men's individual 1500 metres freestyle event at the 1999 European Championships in Istanbul. He has won twenty one French titles since 1998.

References
  Profile

1980 births
Living people
French male long-distance swimmers
French male freestyle swimmers
European Aquatics Championships medalists in swimming
Sportspeople from Clermont-Ferrand
20th-century French people
21st-century French people